La Puerta Formation may refer to:
 La Puerta Formation, Bolivia, a Late Jurassic to Early Cretaceous geologic formation in Bolivia
 La Puerta Formation, Venezuela, a Late Miocene geologic formation in Venezuela